Hóa Hợp [hoa˦ həp˧] is a commune and village in Minh Hóa District, Quảng Bình Province, in Vietnam.

Geography 
Hoa Hop commune is located in the center of Minh Hoa district. To the east, it borders Xuan Hoa commune The West borders on Dan Hoa commune To the south, it borders Hoa Son commune and Trung Hoa commune The North borders with Hoa Tien, Hoa Phuc and Hong Hoa communes.

Hoa Hop commune has an area of 51.84 km², and its population in 2019 is around 3,560 people with population density reaching 69 people/km².

Ho Chi Minh Road runs through Hoa Hop commune.

Administration 
Hoa Hop commune is divided into 8 villages: Da Nang, Lam Hoa, Lam Khai, Tan Binh, Tan Hoa, Tan Loi, Tan Thuan, Tan Tien.

Economy 
The local economy is mainly agriculture and forestry.

Travel 
In the commune, there is a scenic spot of Mo Minh Hoa Waterfall on the Khe Ve river, about 400 meters from Ho Chi Minh Road. 17°51′45″N 105°52′21″E. The service is organized into Thac Mo tourist area in Lam Sum village, about 6 km from the administrative center of the commune.

Populated places in Quảng Bình province
Communes of Quảng Bình province